Anthony Browne may refer to:

 Anthony Browne (died 1506) (1443–1506), Standard Bearer of England, Governor of Queenborough Castle and Constable of Calais
 Anthony Browne (died 1548) (c. 1500–1548), English courtier, son of Sir Anthony, Standard Bearer
 Anthony Browne (judge) (1509–1567), judge and MP who founded Brentwood School, England
 Anthony Browne, 1st Viscount Montagu (1528–1592), son of Sir Anthony (died 1548)
 Anthony Browne (1552–1592), English Sheriff, son of 1st Viscount Montagu
 Anthony-Maria Browne, 2nd Viscount Montagu (1554–1629), son of Anthony (1552–1592)
 Anthony Montague Browne (1923–2013), aide to Winston Churchill in the last ten years of Churchill's life
 Anthony Browne (author) (born 1946), British writer and illustrator of children's books
 Anthony Browne (politician) (born 1967), British journalist, author, and Member of Parliament for South Cambridgeshire

See also
 Tony Browne (born 1973), Irish hurler
 Tony Browne (diplomat) (born 1946), New Zealand diplomat
 Anthony Brown (disambiguation)
 Tony Brown (disambiguation)